Star of Cozzene (foaled 1988 in Kentucky) is a retired American Thoroughbred racehorse who won on both dirt and turf.

A descendant of Nearco through both his sire and his dam, he won the 1991 Kelso Handicap at New York's Belmont Park then with Pat Day riding and with a big late run from off the pace finished a fast-closing narrowly beaten third in the Breeders' Cup Mile behind Opening Verse. In 1992 his owners, Clover Racing Stables, sent him to trainer François Boutin to race in France and England. There, his best result in five starts was a second in the Group 3 Prix du Chemin de Fer du Nord at Chantilly Racecourse.

Star of Cozzene returned to race in the United States in September 1992 where he raced once, finishing ninth in the Arlington Million. The following year, under owner Team Valor, trainer Mark Henning and jockey Jose Santos, five-year-old Star of Cozzene had his best year in racing when he won six events including the Arlington Million, Manhattan Handicap, Caesars International, Man o' War Stakes, as well as defeating 1993 American Horse of the Year Kotashaan in three races in late 1992 and early 1993. In late September 1993, he was sold for $3 million to Tomaeato Farm, owners of breeding farms in Japan. Star of Cozzene was retired from racing in August 1994 with earnings in excess of US$2.3 million. He was sent to stand at stud in Japan.

References

External links
 Star of Cozzene's pedigree and partial racing stats
 Star of Cozzene at the Racing Post

1988 racehorse births
Thoroughbred family 1-n
Racehorses bred in Kentucky
Racehorses trained in the United States